Jamar J. Wilson (born February 22, 1984) is an American-Finnish professional basketball player for Boulazac Basket Dordogne of the LNB Pro B. Standing at , he plays at the point guard position.

High school career
Wilson attended Our Savior New American School in Centereach, New York. As a senior, he averaged 14.2 points, 5.1 assists, 2.6 rebounds and 1.9 steals per game as he led Pioneers to a 25-11 record and the 2002 NACA Division I Boys Basketball National Championship.

College career
Wilson played college basketball at Albany from 2002 to 2007. He made an immediate impact, as he was named the America East Conference rookie of the year and second-team All-Conference as a freshman after averaging 18.9 points and 3.3 assists per game.  After a medical redshirt in the 2003–04 season, Wilson came back to again make the All-Conference second team.

For the next two seasons, Wilson took his game to another level and led the Great Danes to their first two NCAA Division I tournament appearances.  Wilson was named first team All-Conference both years and was named America East Conference player of the year in each of his last two seasons.  Wilson also raised his level of play in the America East tournament, earning tournament MVP honors both years.  Wilson was also named an honorable mention All-American by the Associated Press both seasons.

Wilson scored 2,164 points in his Albany career – the most in school history.  He also set school records in points in a season (620 his senior year), career free throws (601), and finished second all-time in assists (488).  He is the first player in school history to have his jersey retired.

Professional career

Belgium (2007–2010)
In August 2007, Wilson signed with VOO Wolves Verviers-Pepinster of Belgium for the 2007–08 season. In 27 games for Verviers-Pepinster, he averaged 17.6 points, 2.2 rebounds, 3.0 assists and 1.3 steals per game.

In August 2008, Wilson signed with Belgacom Liège Basket for the 2008–09 season. In 30 league games for Liège, he averaged 9.8 points, 2.6 rebounds, 2.9 assists and 1.0 steals per game.

In September 2009, Wilson signed with Generali Okapi Aalstar for the 2009–10 season. In 28 league games for Aalstar, he averaged 12.3 points, 1.8 rebounds, 2.6 assists and 1.4 steals per game.

Finland (2010–2011)
In September 2010, Wilson signed with Honka Espoo Playboys of Finland's Korisliiga for the 2010–11 season. In a game against Namika Lahti in January 2011, Wilson scored 45 points, and two days later, scored 44 points against Helsinki. In 42 games for Honka, he averaged 21.8 points, 4.0 rebounds, 3.3 assists and 1.1 steals per game.

Australia (2011–2015)
On August 5, 2011, Wilson signed with the Cairns Taipans for the 2011–12 NBL season. He was named player of the week twice and finished second in the MVP voting.

On April 3, 2012, Wilson re-signed with the Taipans on a two-year deal.

On March 1, 2014, Wilson recorded a career-high 33 points, along with 8 rebounds and 6 assists, in a 92–87 win over the New Zealand Breakers.

In April 2014, it was announced that Wilson would not re-sign with the Taipans for 2014–15.

On July 8, 2014, Wilson signed a one-year deal with the Adelaide 36ers. On January 13, 2015, he was named Player of the Week for Round 14 after scoring an equal game-high 22 points against Melbourne United on January 10. He went on to win Round 17 Player of the Week honors as well after scoring a game-high 25 points against the Townsville Crocodiles on February 1. After earning All-NBL second team honors for the 2014–15 season, Wilson was named the recipient of the Mark Davis Trophy as the 2015 Adelaide 36ers club MVP.

In 107 NBL games over four seasons, Wilson averaged 16.6 points, 4.7 rebounds and 3.1 assists per game.

Rouen Basket (2015)
On March 12, 2015, Wilson signed with French team SPO Rouen Basket for the rest of the 2014–15 LNB Pro A season. In eight games for Rouen, he averaged 9.5 points, 2.8 rebounds and 2.3 assists per game.

Partizan (2015–2016)
On November 7, 2015, Wilson signed with Serbian team Partizan Belgrade for the rest of the 2015–16 season.

Estudiantes (2016–2017)
On August 1, 2016, Wilson signed with Estudiantes of Spain for the 2016–17 ACB season.

Nanterre 92 (2017–2018)
On November 7, 2017, Wilson signed with Nanterre 92 for the 2017–18 season.

BC Lietkabelis (2018–2019)
On August 2, 2018, he signed with BC Lietkabelis of the Lithuanian Basketball League.

JL Bourg (2019–2020)
On June 12, 2019, he has signed with JL Bourg of the LNB Pro A.

Kataja BC (2020–2022)
On February 18, 2020, Wilson signed with Kataja BC of the Finnish league.

Boulazac Basket (2022–present)
On March 22, 2022, he has signed with Boulazac Basket Dordogne of the LNB Pro B.

National team career
Wilson never received an invitation to play for the United States national team. After having received Finnish citizenship, he immediately became a potential candidate to be a member of the Finnish national team. He made his international debut for Finland on August 1, 2015, in a friendly match against France.

Wilson was a member of the Finnish national team at EuroBasket 2015. On September 5, 2015, he debuted for the team in a 97–87 overtime loss to France in Round 1, scoring a team-high 21 points. In the fourth match of the group stage against Bosnia and Herzegovina, Finland won 88–59 behind Wilson's team-high 16 points. Over five tournament games, Wilson averaged 12.0 points, 1.6 rebounds and 2.8 assists per game.

Personal life
Wilson is the son of Bobby Livingston and Carolyn Wilson. His cousin, Dyree Wilson, was a two-time All-Metro Atlantic Athletic Conference selection at Iona College in 2000 and 2001, and his uncle, James "Pookie" Wilson, was a notable street baller in the Bronx.

Wilson and his wife, former Finland national team player Laura Wilson (née Sario) have a daughter named Fiona. Six months after passing the language test, Wilson received his Finnish passport in June 2015, about five years after his first public intentions to gain Finnish citizenship.

See also 
 List of foreign basketball players in Serbia

References

External links
Albany Great Danes profile
Jamar Wilson at fiba.com
Jamar Wilson at lnb.fr
Jamar Wilson at vtb-league.com

1984 births
Living people
20th-century African-American people
21st-century African-American sportspeople
Adelaide 36ers players
Albany Great Danes men's basketball players
African-American basketball players
American expatriate basketball people in Australia
American expatriate basketball people in Belgium
American expatriate basketball people in Finland
American expatriate basketball people in France
American expatriate basketball people in Serbia
American expatriate basketball people in Spain
American men's basketball players
Basketball League of Serbia players
BC Lietkabelis players
Cairns Taipans players
CB Estudiantes players
Espoon Honka players
Finnish expatriate basketball people in Serbia
Finnish men's basketball players
Finnish people of African-American descent
JL Bourg-en-Bresse players
Kataja BC players
KK Partizan players
Liège Basket players
Liga ACB players
Nanterre 92 players
Naturalized citizens of Finland
Okapi Aalstar players
Point guards
RBC Pepinster players
Sportspeople from the Bronx
Basketball players from New York City